Before the Storm is the debut studio album by Finnish DJ and record producer Darude. It was released on 18 September 2000 by 16 Inch Records. The album sold 800,000 copies worldwide and earned Darude three Finnish Grammy Awards. It also peaked on a number of charts, including number one on the Finland's Official List for albums.

Production and singles
Before the Storm was produced by JS16 (Jaakko Salovaara), and features two of JS16's remixes. The album includes several singles, the first of which, "Sandstorm", had been released prior to the album in 1999 to great success. Darude's second single, "Feel the Beat", followed the success of "Sandstorm", reaching number one on the singles charts in Finland for 2 weeks and number 5 on the UK Singles Chart. Shortly after the album's release, Darude created a vocal edit of "Out of Control", and released it as a single; "Out of Control (Back for More)". This single also charted in major countries and was re-released on several editions of the album.

Release and reception

The album sold 800,000 copies worldwide and earned Darude three Finnish Grammy Awards. It also peaked on a number of charts, including number one on the Finland's Official List for albums, number 6 on the Billboard Dance/Electronic Albums chart and number 11 on the US Independent Albums chart. It also charted high on album charts in a number of other countries, including number 9 in Sweden, number 14 in Norway, number 18 in Canada, number 36 in Australia, and number 34 in France.

Contrary to its chart success, Before the Storm received mixed reviews from critics. AllMusic reviewer Antti J. Ravelin praised the album's singles, but criticised its "monotonality", claiming "Before the Storm may work well on the dancefloor, but it is virtually impossible to listen to the whole album at home".

Track listing

Original release

Special edition
In 2001, 16 Inch Records re-released Before the Storm as a two-disc "Special edition".

Personnel
Adapted from CD liner notes.
 Ville Virtanen (Darude) – writing, production, arrangement
 Jaakko Salovaara (JS16) – writing, production, arrangement, remix, additional production, mixing
 Marko Humpula – writing (track 2)
 Mikko Kivari – writing (track 2)
 Toni Lahde – writing (track 9)
 Pauli Saastamoinen – mastering
 Sampo Hanninen – artwork, cover design

Charts

Weekly charts

Year-end charts

Certifications

See also

2000 in music
List of number-one albums (Finland)
List of best-selling albums in Finland

References

External links
 Darude.com

2000 albums
Darude albums